In a wireless communication system, the link margin (LKM), measured in dB, is the difference between the minimum expected power received at the receiver's end, and the receiver's sensitivity (i.e., the received power at which the receiver will stop working). A 15 dB link margin means that the system could tolerate an additional 15 dB of attenuation between the transmitter and the receiver, and it would still just barely work.

It is typical to design a system with at least a few dB of link margin, to allow for attenuation that is not modeled elsewhere. For example, a satellite communications system operating in the tens of gigahertz might require additional link margin (vs. the link budget assuming lossless propagation), in order to ensure that it still works with the extra losses due to rain fade or other external factors.

A system with a negative link margin cannot transfer data, so one or more of the following are needed: more transmitter power; more antenna gain at the receiver or transmitter; less propagation loss (e.g., better antenna locations and/or shorter paths); lower receiver noise figure; improved error correction coding (FEC); reduced interference; or a lower data rate.

Wireless networking
Telecommunications engineering